Rodrigo Andrés Cerda Norambuena (born February 13, 1973) is a Chilean economist and politician. Between March 2018 and December 2019, he served as Budget Director. He afterwards served as Minister of Finance under the second government of Sebastián Piñera between January 2021 and March 2022.

Early life and education 
Cerda has a doctorate and a master's degree in economics from the University of Chicago, a master's degree in applied macroeconomics, and a commercial engineer with a major in economics from the Pontifical Catholic University of Chile.

Career 
From March 12, 2014 to February 28, 2018, Cerda served as alternate director of the Latin American Center for Economic and Social Policies. In the same period, he was an adjunct professor at the Institute of Economics of the Pontifical Catholic University.

Between 2010 and 2014, during the first government of Sebastián Piñera, Cerda was general coordinator of advisers and macroeconomic coordinator of the Ministry of Finance.

In February 2018, Cerda was called to be part of the cabinet of the second government Sebastián Piñera, occupying the position of Director of Budgets. He resigned on December 12, 2019.

On January 29, 2020, Cerda was appointed by Piñera as director of Codelco, he would remain in office until May 2022.

Minister of Finance, 2021–2022 
On January 26, 2021, Cerda was appointed Ministry of Finance to replace Ignacio Briones after he left office for a presidential candidacy.

Other activities 
 Inter-American Development Bank (IDB), Ex-Officio Member of the Board of Governors (since 2021)

References 

1973 births
Living people
People from Santiago
Chilean Ministers of Finance
21st-century Chilean economists
Pontifical Catholic University of Chile alumni
University of Chicago Booth School of Business alumni